Swami Shri Mahamandaleshwar Santosh Puri Gita Bharatiji, is a guru who was born in Delhi, India in 1944. She was the disciple of Shri 108 Mahamandaleshwar Swami Shri Hariharanand Ji Maharaj since the age of three. She showed remarkable talents at a young age, delivering discourses on the Bhagavad Gita at the age of seven years. It was because of her impressive sermons on the holy Gita that she was dubbed 'Gita Bharati' at the age of 10 years by Rajendra Prasad, who was then the President of India. At the age of 14 years, she took Sannyas Diksha and was termed as Mahamandaleshwar at 18 years of age.

Different Ashram established by Gita Bhartiji
While preaching the Gita in Gujarat, when they finally arrived in Ahmedabad, on 11 November 1963, Swami Shri Hariharanandji Maharaj died.  Pujya Guruji built a beautiful ashram and temple in his memory. Pujya Guruji is also the founder of many ashrams, including ones in Mumbai, Ahmedabad, Delhi, Solapur, and Haridwar, which are also the sites of highly regarded private schools.

First Lady Mahamandaleshwar 
Pujya Gita Bharatiji is a Mahamandaleshwar of the Mahanirvani Akhara Akhada. The Mahanirvani Akhara is made up of about two thousand renouncers. Pujya Guruji is the first woman in history to have the honour of being selected as a Mahamandaleshwar. She is also the author of many books, the most famous being  'Guru Gita'.

External links
Swami Sharad Puri Ji got Diksha from Gita Bhartiji
Gita Bhartiji Visited Om Ashram
THE GREAT LADY YOGI SAINT DIVINE MOTHER SANTOSHPURI GEETA BHARTIJI
SELF REALIZED YOGI SAINT DIVINE MOTHER GEETA BHARTI
Avatar Puri Visited Swami Gita Bhartiji
Gita Bhartiji in Kumbh Mela
Hariharanand public school founded by Gita Bhartiji
Founder SWAMI HARIHARANAND VOCATIONAL TRAINING CENTRE

References

Spiritual teachers
1944 births
People from Delhi
Living people